"Walkabout" is a song by Atlas Sound featuring Noah Lennox. It appears as the third track on his second studio effort Logos. Although never released as a single, it is often seen as the lead single as it was the first song officially released from the album. Upon initial release, Pitchfork Media included it in their best new tracks section and rated it as 34th best song of the year. The track utilizes an extensive sample of "What Am I Going to Do" by The Dovers.

Background
The song came about when Atlas Sound began to tour as the opener for Animal Collective in Europe. Bradford states:

Live rendition
Although the song is mainly constructed from samples, when performing live Cox will rarely use a sampler to recreate it, as he has not since mid-2009. When he toured in late 2009, the song was played with opening band for that tour The Selmanaires. Since early 2010, Cox will simply play the song with an acoustic guitar featuring large improvised sections and occasionally a drum machine.

References

2009 songs